Soraya Renai (born 10 June 1987) is a former professional French female squash player.

Squash career
She competed in the Women's World Team Squash Championships in 2004 and 2006. She achieved her highest singles career ranking of 64 in May 2006.

References 

1987 births
Living people
French female squash players
Sportspeople from Paris